Calvin "C. J." Prosise Jr. (born May 20, 1994) is an American football running back who is a free agent. He was drafted by the Seattle Seahawks in the third round of the 2016 NFL Draft. He played college football at Notre Dame.

Early years
Prosise attended Woodberry Forest School in Madison County, Virginia. He played safety and wide receiver in high school. He was rated by Rivals.com as a three-star recruit at safety. He committed to the University of Notre Dame to play college football over offers from Penn State, North Carolina, Vanderbilt, Virginia Tech, among others.

College career
After redshirting his first year at Notre Dame in 2012, Prosise played in all 13 games as a wide receiver and on special teams his redshirt freshman year in 2013. For the season, he had seven receptions for 72 yards. As a sophomore in 2014, he played in all 13 games and made six starts. He had 29 receptions for 516 yards and two touchdowns and led the team in special teams tackles with 11. Prior to his junior year in 2015, Prosise was moved to running back. After a season-ending injury to Tarean Folston versus Texas, Prosise became the starter. In his first start against Virginia, he rushed for 155 yards with a touchdown. In his second start against Georgia Tech, he rushed for 198 yards and three touchdowns, including a 91-yard rushing touchdown which was the longest in Notre Dame Stadium history. Prosise continued adding big performances throughout the season. He recorded 100 receiving yards at Clemson, rushed for 129 yards (6.1 avg) and three touchdowns against Navy, and rushed for 143 yards and two touchdowns against USC, before being slowed down by injury, limited him to only 13 carries over Notre Dame's last five games. He finished the season rushing for 1,032 yards on 156 carries (6.6 avg) and 11 touchdowns, and 28 receptions for 308 yards and one touchdown.

Following Notre Dame's loss against Ohio State in the Fiesta Bowl, Prosise announced he would forego his remaining eligibility and enter the 2016 NFL Draft.

Professional career

Seattle Seahawks
Prosise was drafted by the Seattle Seahawks in the third round (90th overall) of the 2016 NFL Draft. On May 6, 2016, the Seahawks signed Prosise to a four-year, $3.11 million contract with a signing bonus of $692,464.

Prosise started his first game against the New England Patriots in Week 10, where he carried the ball 17 times for 66 yards and added 87 receiving yards in the win. Prosise also started the Week 11 game against the Philadelphia Eagles and scored his first career touchdown, a 72-yard run, but suffered a fractured scapula that ended his rookie season.

On November 14, 2017, Prosise was placed on injured reserve with an ankle injury. He finished his second season with 23 rushing yards, and 6 receptions for 87 yards during his injury-riddled season.

In 2018, Prosise played in five games before being placed on injured reserve with abdomen, groin, and hip-flexor injuries.

In 2019, Prosise played in nine games, recording 72 rushing yards and a touchdown along with 10 receptions for 76 yards. He suffered a broken arm in Week 16 and was placed on injured reserve on December 24, 2019.

After becoming a free agent in March 2020, Prosise had a tryout with the Detroit Lions on August 13, 2020, and with the Chicago Bears on August 17, 2020.

Houston Texans
On September 7, 2020, Prosise was signed to the Houston Texans practice squad. He was elevated to the active roster on September 19 for the team's week 2 game against the Baltimore Ravens, and reverted to the practice squad after the game. He was elevated again on September 26 for the week 3 game against the Pittsburgh Steelers, and reverted to the practice squad again after the game. He was promoted to the active roster on September 28, 2020. He was released on October 26 and re-signed to the practice squad the next day. He was signed to the active roster on November 14, 2020. On December 28, 2020, Prosise was waived by the Texans.

Tampa Bay Buccaneers
On January 6, 2021, Prosise signed with the practice squad of the Tampa Bay Buccaneers. He was released on January 29, 2021. On February 12, 2021, Prosise re-signed with the Buccaneers. He was released on August 31, 2021.

On December 21, 2021, the Atlanta Falcons hosted Prosise for a workout.

References

External links
Seattle Seahawks bio
Notre Dame Fighting Irish bio

1994 births
Living people
American football running backs
American football wide receivers
Sportspeople from Petersburg, Virginia
Players of American football from Virginia
Notre Dame Fighting Irish football players
Seattle Seahawks players
Houston Texans players
Tampa Bay Buccaneers players